This list of people in Playboy 2010–2020 is a catalog of women and men who appeared in Playboy magazine in the years 2010 to 2020, when the magazine ceased to regularly publish a print edition. Not all of the people featured in the magazine are pictured in the nude.

Entries in blue indicate that the issue marks the original appearance of that year's Playmate of the Year (PMOY).

2010

2011

2012

2013

2014

2015

2016

2017
Beginning in 2017, Playboy was published every two months.

2018

2019
Beginning in 2019, Playboy was published every three months.

2020
In March 2020, Ben Kohn, CEO of Playboy Enterprises, announced that the Spring 2020 issue would be the last regularly scheduled printed issue and that the magazine would now publish its content online. The decision to close the print edition was attributed in part to the COVID-19 pandemic which interfered with distribution of the magazine.

See also
 List of people in Playboy 1953–1959
 List of people in Playboy 1960–1969
 List of people in Playboy 1970–1979
 List of people in Playboy 1980–1989
 List of people in Playboy 1990–1999
 List of people in Playboy 2000–2009

References

Playboy lists
Lists of 21st-century people
People in Playboy (2010-19)
People in Playboy (2010-19)
Playboy